The United Nations General Assembly has granted observer status to international organizations, entities, and non-member states, to enable them to participate in the work of the United Nations General Assembly, though with limitations. The General Assembly determines the privileges it will grant to each observer, beyond those laid down in a 1986 Conference on treaties between states and international organizations. Exceptionally, the European Union (EU) was in 2011 granted the right to speak in debates, to submit proposals and amendments, the right of reply, to raise points of order and to circulate documents, etc. , the EU is the only international organization to hold these enhanced rights, which has been likened to the rights of full membership, short of the right to vote.

Observer status may be granted by a United Nations General Assembly resolution. The status of a permanent observer is based purely on practice of the General Assembly, and there are no provisions for it in the United Nations Charter. The practice is to distinguish between state and non-state observers. Non-member states are members of one or more specialized agencies, and can apply for permanent observer state status. Non-state observers are the international organizations and other entities.

Non-member observers
The General Assembly may invite non-member entities to participate in the work of the United Nations without formal membership, and has done so on numerous occasions. Such participants are described as observers, some of which may be further classified as non-member state observers. Most former non-member observer states accepted observer status at a time when they had applied for membership but were unable to attain it, due to the (actual or threatened) veto by one or more of the permanent members of the Security Council. The grant of observer status is made by the General Assembly only; it is not subject to a Security Council veto.

In some circumstances a state may elect to become an observer rather than full member. For example, to preserve its neutrality while participating in its work, Switzerland chose to remain a permanent non-member state observer from 1948 until it became a member in 2002.

Present non-member observers

, there are two permanent non-member observer states in the General Assembly of the United Nations: the Holy See and Palestine. Both were described as "Non-member States having received a standing invitation to participate as observers in the sessions and the work of the General Assembly and maintaining permanent observer missions at Headquarters". The Holy See uncontroversially obtained its non-member observer state status in 1964. The Holy See did not wish to join the United Nations as a member because "Membership in the organization would not seem to be consonant with the provisions of Article 24 of the Lateran Treaty, particularly as regards spiritual status and participation in possible use of force." Since April 6, 1964, the Holy See has accepted permanent observer state status, which was regarded as a diplomatic courtesy, to enable the Vatican to participate in the UN's humanitarian activities and in the promotion of peace.

In 2012, Palestine's observer status was changed from "non-member observer entity" to "non-member observer state", which many called "symbolic". The change followed an application by Palestine for full UN membership in 2011 as part of the Palestine 194 campaign, to provide additional leverage to the Palestinians in their dealings with Israel. The application had not been put to a UN Security Council vote. 

With the change in status, the United Nations Secretariat held that Palestine was entitled to become a party to treaties for which the UN Secretary-General is the depositary. On 17 December 2012, UN Chief of Protocol, Yeocheol Yoon, declared that "the designation of 'State of Palestine' shall be used by the Secretariat in all official United Nations documents."

The seating in the General Assembly Hall is arranged with non-member observer states being seated immediately after UN member states, and before other observers.  On 10 September 2015, the General Assembly resolved to approve the raising at the UN of the flags of non-member observer states alongside those of the 193 UN member states.

Notes
 The Cook Islands and Niue, both states in free association with New Zealand, are members of several UN specialized agencies, and have had their "full treaty-making capacity" recognized by United Nations Secretariat in 1992 and 1994 respectively.  The Cook Islands has expressed a desire to become a UN member state, but New Zealand has said that they would not support the application without a change in their constitutional relationship, in particular the right of Cook Islanders to New Zealand citizenship.
 The Republic of China, commonly known as Taiwan, was a founding member of the United Nations representing China, which had been divided between the ROC and the People's Republic of China since the Chinese Civil War. However, in 1971 United Nations General Assembly Resolution 2758 transferred China's seat in the UN from the ROC to the PRC.  Since then, Taiwan has sought to resume its participation in UN activities.  Various methods were considered, including seeking observer status, but ultimately the ROC chose to submit more vague requests which did not specify the form of participation it sought between 1993 and 2006.  These requests have been consistently denied due to the UN's recognition of the PRC as the "legitimate representative of China to the United Nations".  The UN Secretary-General concluded from the resolution that the General Assembly considered Taiwan to be a province of China rather than an independent country (something that the ROC contests with the PRC), and thus it is not eligible to become party to treaties for which the UN Secretary-General is the depositary.
 Other countries are recognized by the United Nations as not being self-governing and appear on the United Nations list of non-self-governing territories, but are represented in the UN by their respective administering member state.

Former non-member observers
Sixteen former non-member states were also granted observer status. Fourteen of those states eventually became members of the United Nations. The other two constitute a single special case.

Most of the former non-member observer states accepted this status at a time when they had applied for membership but were unable to attain it, due to the (actual or threatened) veto of one or more of the permanent members of the Security Council. The vetoes were later overcome either by changes in geopolitical circumstances, or by "package deals" under which the Security Council approved multiple new member states at the same time, as was done with a dozen countries in 1955 and with East and West Germany in 1973.

Notes

Entities and international organizations
Many intergovernmental organizations and a few other entities (non-governmental organizations and others with various degrees of statehood or sovereignty), are invited to become observers at the General Assembly. Some of them maintain a permanent office in the United Nations headquarters in New York City, while others do not; however, this is the choice of the organization and does not imply differences in their status.

Regional organization allowed by their member states to speak on their behalf

While the EU is an observer, it is party to some 50 international UN agreements as the only non-state participant. It is a full participant on the Commission on Sustainable Development, the Forum on Forests and the Food and Agriculture Organization. It has also been a full participant at certain UN summits, such as the Rio and Kyoto summits on climate change, including hosting a summit. Furthermore, the EU delegation maintains close relations with the UN's aid bodies. In 2011 the EU was granted enhanced powers in the General Assembly; the right to speak in debates, to submit proposals and amendments, the right of reply, to raise points of order and to circulate documents. These rights were also made open to other international organizations who requested them, if their members have given them the right to speak on their behalf.

In the resolution adopted in May 2011 granting additional rights to the European Union the UNGA decided that similar arrangements may be adopted for any other regional organization that is allowed to speak on behalf of its member states.

Intergovernmental organizations

Other entities

Former observers

See also

 Member states of the United Nations
 List of current permanent representatives to the United Nations
 UN ECOSOC observers
 :Category:United Nations General Assembly observers

Notes

References

External links

 Full list of UNGA and ECOSOC observers with admission resolutions details, January 2010
 United Nations General Assembly
 United Nations missions in New York City
 Non-member States with Observer Status
 Intergovernmental Organizations and Other Entities with Observer Status
 UN Info Quest – Organizations granted observer status in the General Assembly
 Blue Book "Permanent Missions to the United Nations No. 298" dated March 2008

 
United Nations-related lists